The Hunat Hatun Complex is a historic Islamic religious complex in Kayseri, Turkey.

Early in the 13th century, Kayqubad I, Sultan of the Anatolian Selçuks (1219–1237), captured the Alanya fortress (then called Kalon Oros, later renamed Ala'iyya) from its Armenian ruler, Kir Vart. One of the conditions of Vart’s surrender was that his daughter Hunat (“lady” in Persian) Mahperi Hatun would become the sultan’s wife. After her marriage, Lady Hunat (as she is redundantly called in English) converted to Islam and commissioned the Hunat Hatun Complex, made up of the Hunat Hatun Mosque, tomb, medrese, and hamam, which is still functioning and has separate facilities for men and women.

Gallery

References

Seljuk mosques in Turkey
13th-century Islam